Poręby  (Poruby) is a village in the administrative district of Gmina Besko, within Sanok County, Podkarpackie Voivodeship, in south-eastern Poland.

The village has a population of 196.

References

Villages in Sanok County